Another Country is a studio album by singer Cassandra Wilson, featuring the guitar, songwriting and production of Italian guitarist and producer Fabrizio Sotti. The record was released on  via eOne Records label.

Background
The album also marks the end of her 20-year contract with Blue Note label. Another Country features a blend of new songs, instrumentals and arrangements that resulted from the collaboration between Sotti and Wilson. The final track, “Olomuroro” also features backup vocals from the New Orleans Center for Creative Arts Chamber Choir.

The album was recorded in Florence, Italy and New Orleans, Louisiana, and was mixed by Piety Street engineer John Fischbach. The album was released by Ojah Media Group and E1 Entertainment.

Reception

Thom Jurek of AllMusic stated: "On her 19th album, Cassandra Wilson, ever the musical chameleon, changes directions once more. She is arguably the greatest living female jazz singer. Well known for her blues, soul, pop covers, and jazz standards, her smoky alto bends almost everything to its will. Wilson's phrasing is utterly unique, as original as any horn player's or pianist's music.... Though there are a couple of missteps here, Another Country is a welcome new phase for Wilson. Not only are her boundaries as a singer expanding with her musical choices; her songwriting instincts and languages are developing exponentially as well." The Buffalo News review by Jeff Simon noted, "there is so much to glory on this personal and intimate disc of voice/guitar dialogues that you might as well join the ranks of those who have long since learned that Wilson's career is one that one eavesdrops on, rather than basks in while a performer pursues an incorruptible desire to ingratiate."

Daniel Spicer of BBC wrote: "Another Country is an album that radiates warmth. Not just the warmth of southern seas and skies, but the human warmth that beams directly out of Ms Wilson’s heaving heart." Mikael Wood of Time Out added: "Whatever the flavor or provenance of her material, Wilson summons the shadowed sensuality that has become her artistic trademark. It’s hard to imagine a location in which that voice couldn’t make itself at home."

Nate Chinen of The New York Times commented: "Cassandra Wilson named her new album after one of its strongest tracks, a love song that compares the bloom of a new relationship to the discovery of a new world. Singing in her languorous drawl over a fluttering samba rhythm, she paints a vivid, sensual picture, affectionate and self-contained. The song represents a sigh of romantic fulfillment, but also a small shudder of apprehension."

Track listing 
"Red Guitar" (Cassandra Wilson)
"No More Blues" (Wilson, Fabrizio Sotti)
"O Sole Mio" (Arranged by Wilson and Sotti)
"Deep Blue" (Sotti)
"Almost Twelve" (Wilson, Sotti)
"Passion" (Wilson, Sotti)
"When Will I See You Again" (Wilson, Sotti)
"Another Country" (Wilson, Sotti)
"Letting You Go" (Sotti)
"Olomuroro" (Wilson, Sotti, Olalekan Babalola)

Personnel
Band
Cassandra Wilson - Vocals, Acoustic Guitar
Fabrizio Sotti - Electric Guitar, Acoustic Guitar
Mino Cinelu - Percussion
Lekan Babalola - Percussion
Nicola Sorato - Electric Bass
Julien Labro - Accordion
New Orleans Center for Creative Arts Chamber Choir - Vocals on "Olomuroro"

Production
Produced by Cassandra Wilson and Fabrizio Sotti
Engineer at Larione 10: Max Bacchin
Assistant Engineer at Larione 10: Francesco Baldi
Engineer at Sotti Studio: Simone “Keemo” Tonsi and Giorgio Piovan
Engineer at Piety Street: John Fischbach
Assistant Engineer at Piety Street: Wes Fontenot
Mixing: John Fischbach and Wes Fontenot
Mastering: John Fischbach

Charts

References

2012 albums
Cassandra Wilson albums
MNRK Music Group albums